Zdenka Kramplová (born 7 August 1957) was Minister of agriculture of Slovakia from 27 November 2007 until 18 August 2008 and former Foreign Minister of Slovakia from 1997 to 1998. She is a former member of the People's Party – Movement for a Democratic Slovakia.
Mrs. Kramplová studied agriculture in Plovdiv, Bulgaria (1976–1981).

External links
 Interview

1957 births
Living people
Foreign Ministers of Slovakia
People's Party – Movement for a Democratic Slovakia politicians
Members of the National Council (Slovakia) 2006-2010
Slovak women diplomats
Female foreign ministers
Women government ministers of Slovakia
People from Krupina
Female members of the National Council (Slovakia)